This is a list of Albanians in Greece that includes both Greek people of Albanian descent and Albanian immigrants that have resided in Greece. The list is sorted by the fields or occupations in which the notable individual has maintained the most influence.

For inclusion in this list, each individual must have a Wikipedia article indicating notability and show that they are Albanian and have lived in Greece.

Politics
John Spata – Albanian ruler
Yaqub Spata – Lord of Arta
Ahmed Dino – military leader and politician 
Ali Dino – famous Albanian cartoonist and member of the Hellenic Parliament
Abedin Dino - one of the League of Prizren founders and an important figure of the Albanian National Awakening
Hamdi Çami - Deputy of Preveza
Georgios Kountouriotis – Hydriote ship-owner and politician
Antonios Kriezis - Greek captain of the Hellenic navy during the Greek War of Independence and a Prime Minister of Greece from 1849 to 1854.
Alexandros Diomidis - governor of the Central Bank of Greece who became Prime Minister of Greece.
Diomidis Kyriakos - Greek author, politician and Prime Minister of Greece.
Athanasios Miaoulis - Greek military officer and Prime Minister of Greece
Pavlos Kountouriotis - first President of the Second Hellenic Republic.
Dimitrios Voulgaris- Greek revolutionary fighter during the Greek War of Independence of 1821, eight-time Prime Minister of Greece.
Petros Voulgaris- Greek Admiral who served as Prime Minister of Greece in 1945. 
Theodoros Pangalos - Greek general, politician and dictator.
Emmanouil Repoulis - Greek politician and journalist, and Deputy Prime Minister of Greece (1919–1920).
Alexandros Koryzis- Greek politician who was Prime Minister of Greece briefly in 1941
Ioannis Orlandos- Greek politician and revolutionary.
Antonios Miaoulis - Greek politician and a revolutionary leader during the Greek War of Independence.
Lazaros Kountouriotis - Greek Senator and major actor of the Greek War of Independence of 1821.
Athanasios N. Miaoulis - Greek naval officer and politician
Theodoros Pangalos (politician) - Greek politician and leading member of the Panhellenic Socialist Movement (PASOK), grandson of General Theodoros Pangalos.
Spyridon Mercouris - Greek politician and long-serving mayor of Athens in the early 20th century. 
George S. Mercouris - Greek politician who served as a Member of Parliament and Cabinet Minister, founder of the Greek National Socialist Party
Stamatis Merkouris - Greek Army officer and politician, who served as an MP and a Cabinet Minister.
Maurice Spata – Ruler of Arta
Rasih Dino - Diplomat and signatory of Albania to the Treaty of London
Kitsos Tzavellas - Greek fighter in the Greek War of Independence and later Hellenic Army General and Prime Minister of Greece.
Katerina Botsari - Greek courtier.
Photini Tzavela - Greek courtier.
Mid’hat Frashëri - Albanian diplomat, writer and politician
Shahin Dino - Deputy of the sanjak of Preveza in the Ottoman Parliament and later Minister of Interior of Albania
Jakup Veseli - from Margariti, representative of Chameria in Vlora Congress, signatory of Albanian Declaration of Independence.
Osman Taka - well-known dancer of his time
Sgouros Spata - Albanian ruler
Niazi Demi - Minister of trade of Albania.
Rexhep Demi - From Filiates, representative of Chameria in Vlora Congress, signatory of Albanian Declaration of Independence.
Thoma Çami - Founder and chairman of organisation "Bashkimi", the best-known cultural club, of Rilindja Kombëtare
Veli Gërra - Representative of Chameria in Vlora Congress, signatory of Albanian Declaration of Independence
Refo Çapari - Albanian politician and religious leader
Hamdi Bey - Ottoman officer and politician
Omer Fortuzi - Albanian politician and mayor of Tirana from 1940 through 1943.
Xhemil Dino - Albanian politician and diplomat
Mehmed Konica - Albanian politician. He served three times as the Foreign Minister of Albania

Military
Ali Pasha of Ioannina - Albanian ruler who served as pasha of a large part of western Rumelia.
Veli Pasha - Pasha of the Morea Eyalet.
Thopia Zenevisi – 14th century Anti Ottoman rebellion leader
Yakup Ağa – Ottoman Sipahi of Albanian or Turkish descent
Manuel Bokali – military commander
Petros Lantzas - Corfiot Greek, spy, privateer and pirate
Emmanuel Mormoris - Cretan military commander and notable political figure in the Republic of Venice.
Murat Reis the Elder - Ottoman privateer and admiral.
Hayreddin Barbarossa – Greek-Albanian or Greek-Turkish corsair and later admiral of the Ottoman Navy
Demitre - Albanian count in the Catalan dominions in late-14th-century Thessaly.
David Arianites - high-ranking Byzantine commander of the early 11th century.
Peter Losha - Albanian clan leader in medieval Epirus. 
Mercurio Bua – Commander of the Venetian army
Oruç Reis – Greek-Albanian or Greek-Turkish Ottoman bey and admiral
Murat Reis the Elder – Ottoman privateer and admiral
Hasan Tahsin Pasha – Ottoman military officer
Mehmet Esat Bülkat – Ottoman general
Wehib Pasha – military officer
Hasan Rami Pasha – Ottoman career officer
Spiro Bellkameni – Albanian military commander
Georgios Drakos - Greek general and fighter of the Greek War of Independence.
Markos Drakos - Lieutenant General of the Hellenic Army most notable for his leadership during the Greco-Italian War of 1940–41.
Kostas Botsaris - Greek general and senator.
Notis Botsaris - Greek general and leader of the Botsari clan.
Tousias Botsaris - Greek commander and fighter of the Greek War of Independence.
Dimitrios Botsaris - Greek Army officer and Minister for Military Affairs.
Kitsos Botsaris leader of the Souliotes.
Vasilios Lazarou - Spetsiote shipowner, fighter of the Greek War of Independence and politician.
Giotis Danglis Greek leader of the Greek revolutionary army during the Greek War of Independence.
Panagiotis Danglis - Greek Army general and politician.
Lambros Koutsonikas - Greek general and fighter of the Greek Revolution of 1821.
Lambros Tzavelas - leader of the Souliotes.
Gardikiotis Grivas, Greek revolutionary in the Greek War of Independence. 
Moscho Tzavela - Greek heroine of the years before the outbreak of the Greek War of Independence, 
Nikolaos Zervas - Greek revolutionary and Army general.
Ali Demi – World War II hero of Albania born in Filiates, Greece in 1918, and died during a battle with Axis forces in Vlora, Albania in 1943. After him was created the first Cham battalion in ELAS army, the battalion "Ali Demi"
Musa Demi – Revolutionary and important figure of the Albanian National Awakening
Aziz Çami – Officer of the Albanian army and Balli Kombëtar commander
Laskarina Bouboulina - Greek naval commander, heroine of the Greek War of Independence in 1821, and considered the first woman to attain the rank of admiral.
Dimitris Plapoutas - Greek general who fought during the Greek War of Independence against the rule of the Ottoman Empire.
Andreas Miaoulis - Greek revolutionary, admiral, and politician
Odysseas Androutsos - Greek military and political commander in eastern mainland Greece
Dimitrios Kriezis - Greek naval officer.
Alexandros Kontoulis - Greek Army officer who rose to the rank of Lieutenant General.
Dimitrios Miaoulis - Greek revolutionary leader
Sofoklis Dousmanis - Greek naval officer, twice chief of the Greek Navy General Staff, and occupant of the post of Minister for Naval Affairs in 1935.
Viktor Dousmanis - Greek Army officer, who rose to the rank of Lieutenant General. 
Nikolaos Votsis - Greek naval officer who distinguished himself during the Balkan Wars and rose to the rank of Rear Admiral.
Emmanouil Miaoulis - Greek naval officer.
Meletis Vasileiou - leader in the Greek War of Independence who contributed to the organization of the revolutionary forces in Attica.
Emmanouil A. Miaoulis - Greek naval officer active during the first decades of the existence of the Royal Hellenic Navy.
Nikolaos Miaoulis - Greek navy personnel, aide-de-camp to Otto of Greece until his abdication.
Anastasios Tsamados - Greek admiral of the Greek War of Independence.
Andreas D. Miaoulis - Greek naval officer, Minister of Naval Affairs in 1020
Ioannis A. Miaoulis - Greek naval officer.
Nikolaos Kriezotis - Greek leader in Eboea during the Greek War of Independence.
Ioannis Miaoulis - Greek naval officer.
Georgios Sachtouris - Hydriot ship captain and a leading admiral of the Greek War of Independence.
Iakovos Tombazis - merchant and ship-owner from Hydra who became the first Admiral of the Greek Navy during the Greek War of Independence 
Andreas D. Vokos - Greek naval officer.
Emmanouil Tombazis - Greek naval captain from Hydra, active during the Greek War of Independence.
Andreas A. Miaoulis - Greek naval officer, grandson of Andreas Miaoulis, the celebrated admiral of the Greek War of Independence.
Dimitrios D. Miaoulis - Greek naval officer, son of Dimitrios Miaoulis. 
Markos Botsaris - Greek hero of the Greek War of Independence and chieftain of the Souliotes.

Religious
Nephon II of Constantinople – Greek-Albanian Ecumenical Patriarch of Constantinople
Constantine Kabasilas - prominent Byzantine cleric in the mid-13th century.
Kristo Negovani - Albanian nationalist figure, religious leader and writer
Athenagoras I of Constantinople - Greek archbishop in North America
Ieronymos II of Athens - Archbishop of Athens and All Greece and the primate of the Autocephalous Orthodox Church of Greece.
Eulogios Kourilas Lauriotis - bishop of the Orthodox Autocephalous Church of Albania.
Polykarpos Bithikoukis - Metropolitan of Larissa in 1811–18 and 1820–21.

Authors and Scholars
Anastas Kullurioti, writer and Albanian rights activist.
Panayotis Koupitoris – Arvanite Greek writer 
Faik Konitza - Albanian writer 
Onufri - 16th century painter of Orthodox icons and Archpriest of Elbasan.
Michele Greco da Valona - 15th/16th-century painter from Vlorë.
Nicholas Leonicus Thomaeus - was a Venetian scholar and professor of philosophy at the University of Padua.
Vangelis Liapis - Greek scholar and folklorist.
Anastas Byku - Albanian publisher and journalist.
Aristeidis Kollias - Greek lawyer, publicist, historian and folklorist.
Ioannis Altamouras – Greek painter of the 19th century famous for his paintings of seascapes
Bilal Xhaferri – Albanian poet and novelist, and a political dissident
Qamil Çami - Teacher and poet of era of the Albanian National Awakening
 Eleni Boukoura-Altamoura - Greek painter, noted as being the first great female painter of Greece.
 Gerasimos Vokos- Greek scholar, writer, painter, and journalist.
 Nikolaos Vokos- Greek painter of the Munich School art movement.
 Andreas Kriezis- Greek painter, primarily of portraits and maritime subjects.
 Anastasios Orlandos - Greek architect and historian of architecture.
 Tasos Neroutsos - Greek physician and scholar.
 Alexandros Pallis - Greek educational and language reformer who translated the New Testament into Modern Greek. 
Marco Pallis - Greek-British author and mountaineer.
Marietta Pallis - Greek-Briton ecologist and botanical artist.

Cinema
Laert Vasili – Greek-Albanian actor and director.
Neritan Zinxhiria – Greek-Albanian filmmaker 
Jon Lolis – Greek actor

Musicians
Haris Alexiou - Greek singer, considered one of the most popular singers in Greece. 
Claydee – Greek-Albanian music artist, producer, songwriter and music executive
Eleni Foureira – Greek singer and dancer
Sin Boy – Greek-Albanian rapper
Toquel– Greek rapper

Sports
Thomas Strakosha – Albanian professional footballer who plays as a goalkeeper for Italian club Lazio and the Albania national team
Enea Mihaj – Albanian professional footballer
Dhimitri Strakosha – Greek footballer
Ilir Kastrati - Albanian footballer
Kristo Shehu - Albanian professional footballer
Fatjon Andoni – Football player
Damian Gjini – Football player
Vasil Shkurti – Albanian professional footballer
Fiorin Durmishaj – Football player
Areta Konomi – Greek former professional volleyball player
Marios Vrousai – Greek professional footballer
Anestis Nastos – Football player
Steljano Velo – Football player
Albi Alla - Albanian professional footballer.
Donald Açka – Football player
Maldin Ymeraj - Albanian professional footballer.
Myrto Uzuni - Albanian professional footballer.
Ermal Tahiri - Albanian retired footballer.
Simo Rrumbullaku - Albanian professional footballer.
Andi Renja - Albanian footballer.
Orestis Menka - Albanian footballer.
Panagiotis Kone - Greek professional footballer for the Greece national team
Stefanos Kapino – Greek-born Albanian footballer for the Greece national team
Mihal Thano – Greek–born Albanian footballer
Giorgos Kakko – Greek–born Albanian footballer
Emiljano Shehu – Football player
Erind Prifti – Football player
Neti Meçe - Football player
Mirela Maniani - Football player
Qazim Laçi - Football player
Kristian Kushta - Football player
Enea Koliçi - Football player
Bledar Kola - Football player
Jani Kaçi - Football player
Ergys Kaçe - Football player
Gertin Hoxhalli - Football player
Klodian Gino - Football player
Enea Gaqollari - Football player
Bledi Muca – Greek professional footballer
Lefter Millo – Albanian professional footballer
Ardit Toli – Albanian footballer
Savva Lika – retired javelin thrower who represented Greece
Alexandros Bimai – Football player
Jorgo Meksi – Albanian footballer
Lazaros Rota – Greek footballer
Angelo Tafa – Albanian footballer
Kosta Vangjeli – Albanian-Greek footballer
Andreas Ntoi – Greek footballer
Elina Tzengko — athlete

References

Greece